The nkhomo-benga peacock (Aulonocara baenschi), also known as the new yellow regal peacock, is a species of haplochromine cichlid which is endemic to Lake Malawi. This species is threatened by capture for the aquarium trade.

Distribution
The Nkhomo-benga peacock is endemic to Lake Malawi where has only been recorded from the Nkhomo Reef and possibly nearby areas of western Lake Malawi.

Habitat and ecology
Scientific Name: Aulonocara Baenschi Common Name: Yellow Sunshine PeacockAdult Size: 5 inchesLife Expectancy: 10 Years
Habitat: East African Lake Malawi 
Minimum Tank Size: 50 Gallons
Ideal Tank Conditions:  
Temperature Range:  78°F
pH Range: 7.0-8.0
Hardness Range: 10-25°
Temperament:  Semi aggressive. Generally peaceful but may become territorial, particularly while spawning. Diet & Nutrition:  Carnivorous - prefers live foods such as blood worms, snails or brine shrimp, but will generally accept frozen, flake or pellet foods.

The Nkhomo-benga peacock inhabits sandy areas interspersed with rocks where it hunts small invertebrates, which are detected in the sand using enlarged cephalic pores. Feeding may be by sifting the substrate in its mouth or by using a more active predatory method where it watches the substrate for movement and grabs the prey item. The males are territorial and show their breeding colour all year, the territory is centred on a shelter excavated by the male. The females live in small schools. If a female is enticed to lay eggs by the male's courtship display she will lay eggs and take them into her mouth. The males of this species has spots resembling eggs on their anal fins and the female is attracted to these, opening her egg filled mouth to attempt to swallow these "eggs", when she does the male releases his milt to inseminate the eggs in her mouth. The eggs will be mouthbrooded for four weeks before she releases the free swimming fry.

Threats
The main threat to this critically endangered cichlid is capture for the aquarium trade.

Etymology
The specific name honours  Ulrich Baensch, the inventor of the dried falke fish food, Tetramin, and who founded Tetra GmbH.

See also
List of freshwater aquarium fish species

References

Nkhomo-benga peacock
Endemic fauna of Malawi
Fish of Malawi
Taxa named by Manfred K. Meyer
Taxa named by Rüdiger Riehl
Nkhomo-benga peacock
Taxonomy articles created by Polbot
Fish of Lake Malawi